Erran Boaz Baron Cohen (born May 1968) is an English composer and trumpet player known for collaborations with his younger brother, Sacha Baron Cohen.

Life and career
Baron Cohen is a founding member of the world music group Zohar who are signed to Miles Copeland's Ark 21 label. He also scored the original music for his brother's films Borat, Brüno, The Dictator, and Grimsby, as well as his TV series Da Ali G Show and Who Is America?.

After scoring the Borat movie, Baron Cohen was asked by the Turan Alem Kazakhstan Philharmonic Orchestra to compose a classical piece containing Kazakh influences. Baron Cohen currently sings and plays keyboards and trumpet for the pop band Ridiculous together with Jon Moss, Sebastian Wocker, and bassist Peter Noone.

Filmography
Borat (2006) – Music
Brüno (2009) – Music
The Infidel (2010) – Music
The Dictator (2012) – Music
Just Before I Go (2014) – Music
The Contract (2015) – Music
Grimsby (2016) – Music
The Bromley Boys (2019) – Music
Borat Subsequent Moviefilm (2020) – Music

References

External links
 in 2008
Zohar's site

1967 births
Living people
English composers
English Jews
English people of Israeli descent
English people of Belarusian-Jewish descent
English people of German-Jewish descent
English people of Welsh descent
English trumpeters
Male trumpeters
British world music musicians
21st-century English musicians
Erran
21st-century trumpeters
21st-century British male musicians